Ulmus 'Louis van Houtte' (Syn. Ulmus 'Vanhouttei') is believed to have been first cultivated in Ghent, Belgium circa 1863. It was first mentioned by Franz Deegen in 1886. It was once thought a cultivar of English Elm Ulmus minor 'Atinia', though this derivation has long been questioned; W. J. Bean called it "an elm of uncertain status". Its dissimilarity from the type and its Belgian provenance make the 'Atinia' attribution unlikely. Fontaine (1968) considered it probably a form of U. × hollandica.

The cultivar is named for the Belgian horticulturist and plant collector Louis Benoit van Houtte, 1810–1876.

Description
When young, the tree has leaves entirely yellow, a colour retained throughout summer. However, as the tree ages, the colouring may begin a gradual reversion to green. A mature specimen which retained its yellow colouration in the crown stood in Edinburgh's Royal Circus Gardens till the early 1990s. The vertically fissured bark of mature trees is unlike that of English elm, with its squarish scaly fissuring. 'Louis van Houtte' has smaller leaves than the not dissimilar Ulmus glabra 'Lutescens' (Golden Wych Elm).

Pests and diseases
'Louis van Houtte' is vulnerable to Dutch elm disease (DED). Two specimens planted at Kew Gardens in the Pagoda Vista succumbed very rapidly to the earlier strain of DED in 1931.

Cultivation
Before Dutch elm disease the tree was commonly cultivated in northern Europe. The Späth nursery of Berlin marketed it in the late 19th century as U. campestris Louis van Houtte, under which name it was introduced to the Dominion Arboretum, Ottawa, Canada, in 1898, and to the Ryston Hall arboretum, Norfolk, UK, (planted 1913). In the UK the tree was supplied by Hillier & Sons Nursery of Winchester, Hampshire, as U. procera 'Vanhouttei' / 'Louis van Houtte'. The tree appeared in the 1902 catalogue of the Bobbink and Atkins nursery, Rutherford, New Jersey, as Ulmus aurea Louis van Houtte, and in Kelsey's 1904 catalogue, New York, as U. 'Louis van Houtte'. It is less commonly cultivated in Australasia, where the golden wych elm Ulmus glabra 'Lutescens' has sometimes been mistakenly sold by nurseries under the name 'Louis van Houtte'. The description, "The finest of the golden elms, with a large leaf of a clear golden colour", in the 1918 catalogue of the Gembrook or Nobelius Nursery near Melbourne, suggests 'Lutescens' rather than 'Louis van Houtte'. Three trees in separate locations are known in the British Isles, as well as a partial avenue in Aberdeen (see 'Notable trees'). The cultivar remains in commerce at a nursery in the US.

Notable trees
Several large trees survive in Sweden, including a specimen in Kristianstad and one, planted c.1890 (girth 3.7 m), in the Serafimerparken, Stockholm (2017). Osborne Place, Aberdeen is lined mostly with 'Louis Van Houtte' planted in 1936.

The largest known tree is an old specimen located in Christchurch Botanic Gardens, New Zealand. The tree has a diameter of 179.9 cm, is 27.7 m high and has an average canopy spread of 31.1 m (2023).

Synonymy
'Ludwig van Houtte': Spath-Buch, 1720–1920, 229, 1921, in error.
Ulmus montana lutescens van Houttei: Schelle in Beissner et al., Handbuch der Laubholz-Benennung 86. 1903, in error.
Ulmus minor foliis flavescentibus: Miller, The Gardeners Dictionary ed. 2. 1735, Ulmus no. 8.

Accessions

North America
None known.

Europe
Brighton & Hove City Council, UK. NCCPG Elm Collection. UK champion: Carden Park, 21 m high, 61 cm d.b.h. (1996).
Grange Farm Arboretum, Lincolnshire, UK. Acc. no. 1134, as U. minor 'Louis van Houtte'.
National Botanic Gardens (Ireland), Glasnevin, Dublin. Location A3 (156)
Wijdemeren city council, Netherlands. Elm collection, one tree planted 2018 Anton Smeerdijkgaarde, Kortenhoef.

Australasia
 Royal Botanic Gardens Victoria (Melbourne), Australia
 Christchurch Botanic Gardens, Christchurch, New Zealand. 1 tree, details not known. 
 Eastwoodhill Arboretum , Gisborne, New Zealand. 2 trees, details not known.
 Manukau Cemetery, Papatoetoe, Auckland, New Zealand. 1 tree.

Nurseries

Europe
Centrum voor Botanische Verrijking vzw, Kampenhout, Belgium.
 Noordplant Nurserys, Glimmen, Netherlands

North America
Foothills Nursery, Mt. Airy, North Carolina, United States

Australasia
Southern Woods Plant Nursery, Christchurch, New Zealand

Notes

References

External links
  Labelled U. Louis van Houtte, Kew specimen, 1885, from Simon-Louis frères, Metz
  dated 1901
  RBGE specimen, 1902
  RBGE specimen, 1902
  RBGE specimen, 1902

Elm cultivars
Ulmus articles with images
Ulmus